Schuch is a German surname.

In some orthographies it is spelled Szuch. It may refer to:

Albrecht Schuch, German actor
Carl Eduard Schuch, Austrian painter
Johann Christian Schuch, designer and architect
Karoline Schuch, German actress
Timuzsin Schuch, Hungarian handball player
Ernst Edler von Schuch, Austrian conductor

See also
Clara Bohm-Schuch

German-language surnames